Darakeh is a neighbourhood located north of the provincial capital of Tehran, Iran. 
It is near Evin and Velenjak. It is a popular hiking area that attracts many tourists.

Neighbourhoods in Tehran